Ray Story (born in 1964) is the founder and owner of The United Tobacco Vapor Group (UTVG) USA as well as UTVG Europe BV, an electronic cigarette company. He is also the creator of Flavor Vapes, Premium Vapes, Vape Master Cigar, Wanna Vape, and E-Hitter, all brands under the UTVG name. The company's products are sold globally online and in store.

He is also the creator of a new patented vaporization technology for the E-Cigarette called "qmos" which moves away from the traditional heating methods of first generation vaporizers and e-cigarettes in favor of a wick-less and coil-less technology for longevity and consistency.

Ray is also the founder and CEO of The Tobacco Vapor Electronic Cigarette Association (TVECA), a nonprofit organization dedicated to creating a sensible and responsible electronic cigarette market by providing the media, legislative bodies, and consumers with education, communication, and research. He successfully defended the position of the e-cigarette as an alternative tobacco product as opposed to a drug delivery device in the United States in 2009 and defended from the Dutch government in their attempts to ban the e-cigarette in 2012. Ray alongside the TVECA is currently working to duplicate this process in other parts of the world where there exists highly prohibitive or restrictive laws pertaining to the e-cigarette.

Prior to this, Ray founded an Electronic Cigarette company in 2008 called "Smoking Everywhere". As owner of Smoking Everywhere, Ray initiated the litigation against the FDA claiming the e-cigarette was indeed a tobacco product and not a drug delivery device. On December 7, 2010, Ray and the E-Cigarette industry won a unanimous court decision siding with the industry position.

References

External links
 https://www.fda.gov/downloads/NewsEvents/PublicHealthFocus/UCM173191.pdf  – The initial injunction filing against the FDA from Smoking Everywhere
 https://vapexpo.ru/en/post/rey-stori-generalniy-direktor-tveca-i-noviy-spiker-cis-vapour-dialogues – Ray Story speaking at VapExpo in Amsterdam
 http://ec.europa.eu/health//sites/health/files/tobacco/docs/ev_201300117_mi_en.pdf – Ray and the TVECA working with The EU Commission to form an E-Cigarette Regulatory framework (now, The Tobacco Products Directive).
 http://www.cspdailynews.com/category-news/tobacco/articles/fda-e-cig-deeming-rule-imminent – Ray Story interviewed by CSP about the new Deeming Regulations on tobacco products in the US

1964 births
Living people
American chief executives